The state of Berlin has three instruments of direct democracy. These enable German citizen residents to directly influence policy, in addition to indirect democracy via elected officials in the House of Representatives. In addition, there are two instruments at the borough level.

Types 
The three direct democracy instruments at the Berlin state level are:

 Agenda initiative, a petition which forces the Berlin House of Representatives to debate a certain topic;
Referenda require 25% quoracy;
 Constitutional referendum, a referendum that changes the state constitution. In addition to the requirements of regular referenda, it requires a vote in the House of Representatives with a two-thirds majority and at least 50% turnout. This was used once, in 2006.

In addition to these instruments for direct democracy at the city-state level, there are two instruments at the lower, borough, level:

 Residents' request, a petition which forces the borough assembly to address a certain topic;
 Citizens' decision, which requires the collection of signature of at least 3% of eligible voters (citizens' initiative), see .

History of the framework of direct democracy in Berlin 
In 2020, the Berlin government started a reform that would make it easier to organise petitions and referenda at both the Berlin and borough levels.

Past Berlin-wide initiatives

Past agenda initiatives

Democracy for All (2022) 
The agenda initiative "Democracy for All" was a petition passed in 2022 with three demands. Firstly, it asked for a reduction of the voting age from 18 to 16 for Berlin House of Representatives elections and referenda. Secondly, the petition set out that non-German citizens could vote after living in Germany for three years. For this purpose, the petition asked the House of Representatives to request a Bundesrat initiative from the Berlin Senate, which represents Berlin in the Bundesrat. The initiative would give full active and passive voting rights for elections to municipal councils, state legislatures (including the Berlin House of Representatives), to the Bundestag and to the European Parliament. Thirdly, the initiative demanded that Berlin agenda initiatives and referenda could be initiated and signed digitally.

As a result of the agenda initiative, in December 2022 the Berlin House of Representatives passed a motion to implement parts of the agenda initiative. Under the motion, the first of the three demands (voting from 16 years on) would be met, and foreigners would be allowed to vote after five years of residency instead of three. However, the motion passed under a red-green-red coalition government and set out its implementation only after the 2023 re-run of the Berlin elections.

Past referenda

Referendum to municipalise housing (2021)

Referendum to make Berlin climate-neutral by 2030 (2023) 

 Legend:  Percentages indicate the share of 'yes' voters in the referenda. Colours of the borough numbers: former West Berlin,  former East Berlin,  contains former East and West territories

Past borough-level initiatives

Mitte 
In 2008, a Mitte citizens' decision against parking charges failed to achieve quoracy.

Friedrichshain-Kreuzberg 
In 2008, the "Spreeufer für alle!" (Spree riverfront for all!) citizens' decision passed with 87% 'yes' votes. It asked the borough of Friedrichshain-Kreuzberg to block construction on the banks of the Spree river by the Mediaspree project. Five years later, the borough government was criticised for implementing it only partially.

In 2016, a citizens' decision to block a costly refurbishment of the Landwehr Canal's Fraenkelufer failed to achieve quoracy.

Pankow

Charlottenburg-Wilmersdorf

Spandau

Steglitz-Zehlendorf

Tempelhof-Schöneberg 
In 2009, a citizens' decision passed in the borough of Tempelhof-Schöneberg to award monument protection to the former Tempelhof Airport, which had been shut in 2008.

Neukölln

Treptow-Köpenick 
In 2014, a citizens' decision kept parking in the Treptow-Köpenick borough free of charge.

Marzahn-Hellersdorf

Lichtenberg

Reinickendorf

See also 

 Referendums in Germany

External links 

 Berlin in the Navigator to Direct Democracy

References 
German constitutional law